Znamenka is a rural locality (a village) in Krivle-Ilyushkinsky Selsoviet, Kuyurgazinsky District, Bashkortostan, Russia. The population was 88 as of 2010. There are 3 streets.

Geography 
Znamenka is located 22 km east of Yermolayevo (the district's administrative centre) by road. Novoyamashevo is the nearest rural locality.

References 

Rural localities in Kuyurgazinsky District